First Provincial Legislative Council election was held in Punjab in 1920 as mandated by the Government of India Act 1919.

Introduction
The First World War gave the momentum to the growing demand for self-government in British India. Therefore, the new constitutional reforms, under the Montagu–Chelmsford Reforms were introduced by British Government. The scheme was implemented through the Government of India Act 1919. The first Council was constituted on 8 January 1921 for the first time. The election for first Council was held in December 1920. 71 members were elected and 22 were nominated by Governor.

In 1920 the election was not contested on Party lines thus all elected candidates considered as Independent.

The term of the council was fixed for three years. The council, for first time, was presided by a nominated person designated as President and in his absence, an elected person designated as Deputy President.

The first election which was conducted in the house was of Deputy President between Mehtab Singh and Chaudhary M. Amin. Mehtab Singh won election by securing 48 votes, while Amin secured 37 Votes.

The First Council had held 98 meetings when the Lieutenant Governor of Punjab dissolved the council on 27 October 1923 after completion of three years tenure.

Distribution of seats

Special^ (Non-Territorial)

 Punjab Landholders - 3
 General - 1
 Mohammadan - 1
 Sikh - 1
 Baluch Tumandars - 1
 Punjab Universities - 1
 Punjab Commerce and Trade - 1
 Punjab Industry - 1

Voter statistics
Total Voters - 5,33,812
Total Vote Turnout - 34.81%
Territorial Constituencies voters - 5,29,189
Highest No. of Voters - 34,594 in South-Eastern Towns (Muhammadan-Urban)
Lowest No. of Voters - 2,271 in Dera Gazi Khan (Muhammadan-Rural)
Highest Turnout - 67% in Gujarat East (Muhammadan-Rural)
Lowest Turnout - 2% in Amritsar City (Mohammadans-Urban)
Non-Territorial Constituencies voters - 4,623
Highest No. of Voters - 1,984 in Punjab Universities 
Lowest No. of Voters - 11 in Baluch Tumandars
Highest Turnout - 100% in Baluch Tumandars
Lowesr Turnout - 43% in Punjab Universities

Office bearer

Election schedule

 Election schedule in special constituencies were not same and the dates were different, unfortunately not available.

Constituency wise result
 Candidate Elected Unopposed

General-Urban

General-Rural

Muhammadan-Urban

Muhammadan-Rural

Sikh-Urban

Sikh-Rural

Special

See also
Punjab legislative council (British India)

References

State Assembly elections in Punjab, India
Punjab